Nellie (Len) Rempt-Halmmans de Jongh (Utrecht, 11 August 1927 - Huizen, 26 April 2013) was a Dutch politician, who was a member of the House of Representatives from 1975 to 1979, 1982–1989, and 1990–1994.

References

Drs. N. (Len) Rempt-Halmmans de Jongh at parlement.com

1927 births
2013 deaths
Dutch women in politics
Members of the House of Representatives (Netherlands)
People's Party for Freedom and Democracy politicians
Politicians from Utrecht (city)
Knights of the Order of the Netherlands Lion